Mouhamadou Moustapha Beye (born 6 August 1995), known as Moustapha Beye, is a Senegalese professional footballer who plays for Floriana in the Maltese Premier League.

Club career
He made his professional debut in the Serie B for Novara on 13 June 2014 in a game against Varese.

Since July 2018, he plays for French Championnat National side Pau FC.

References

External links
 

1995 births
Footballers from Dakar
Living people
Senegalese footballers
Senegalese expatriate footballers
Association football defenders
Novara F.C. players
A.C.N. Siena 1904 players
Pau FC players
Floriana F.C. players
Serie B players
Serie C players
Championnat National players
Maltese Premier League players
Expatriate footballers in Italy
Expatriate footballers in France
Expatriate footballers in Malta
Senegalese expatriate sportspeople in Italy
Senegalese expatriate sportspeople in France
Senegalese expatriate sportspeople in Malta